The 2015 TCU Horned Frogs football team represented Texas Christian University (TCU) in the 2015 NCAA Division I FBS football season. The 120th TCU football team played as a member of the Big 12 Conference (Big 12), led by 15th-year head coach Gary Patterson. The Horned Frogs played their home games at Amon G. Carter Stadium in Fort Worth, Texas.

TCU (11–2, 7–2) finished the season ranked #7 in the nation after a victory in the Alamo Bowl. The season marked the Horned Frogs' fifth top-10 finish and sixth top-15 finish in the last 8 seasons. The Horned Frogs notched their sixth 11+ win season in the last 8 years and their tenth 10+ win season in the 15-year Gary Patterson era.

Previous season
The 2014 TCU Horned Frogs football team notched a 12–1 record and finished the season ranked #3. The Horned Frogs introduced a new, up-tempo offense in 2014 under new co-offensive coordinators Doug Meacham and Sonny Cumbie, led by junior quarterback Trevone Boykin, who finished 4th in the 2014 Heisman Trophy voting. The Frogs' sole loss came at #5 Baylor, 58–61. TCU knocked off three top-10 teams during their 2014 campaign, #4 Oklahoma, #7 Kansas State and #9 Ole Miss. During the regular season, the Horned Frogs ranked as high as #3 in the College Football Playoff Rankings and were in the mix to be included in the inaugural, 4-team College Football Playoff. In the next-to-last CFP rankings, the Frogs checked in at #3; however, even after a decisive 55–3 win over Iowa State in the final week, the College Football Playoff Selection Committee dropped the Big 12 Co-Champion Horned Frogs from #3 to #6, and out of the Playoff, in the final regular-season rankings. The Horned Frogs were invited to play in the 2014 Peach Bowl, in Atlanta, Georgia, against the Ole Miss Rebels of the SEC. The Horned Frogs shut down the Rebel offense and picked apart the vaunted Ole Miss defense in a decisive 42–3 TCU victory.

Preseason

Recruiting
National Signing Day unofficially kicked off the new season on February 5, 2015. The Horned Frogs inked 21 high school seniors to National Letters of Intent and added two additional playmakers by grayshirt. Hoping to build on the success of the new up-tempo offense installed by Co-offensive coordinators Doug Meacham and Sonny Cumbie in 2014, the 2015 signing class included six wide receivers. Three signees graduated from high school in December 2014 and enrolled at TCU for the spring term.

In addition to the above-listed signees, TCU added consensus 3-star wide receive Darrion Flowers (5'9", 170, Sam Houston HS, Arlington, TX), who accepted a track and field scholarship for 2015–16 and will join the football team before the 2016 season.  Similarly, TCU added kicker Jonathan Song (5'9", 160, All Saints HS, Fort Worth, TX), who will also grayshirt during the 2015–16 season and count against the 2016 recruiting class.  Flowers and Song will fill areas of need in 2016 after the loss of PK, P, and WRs at the conclusion of the 2015 season.

It was widely reported in early 2015 that former Southlake Carroll standout and Gatorade Football Player of the Year Kenny Hill would transfer from Texas A&M to TCU before the 2015 season. Hill confirmed his transfer on May 22, 2015, and enrolled for the summer term. As a transfer, Hill can practice with the 2015 team, but he will be ineligible for play until 2016.

During the summer, TCU added walk-on athlete Rocket Ismail, Jr. (5'11", 176, Ranchview HS, Carrollton, TX), son of All-American, Notre Dame legend and former CFL and NFL player Raghib "Rocket" Ismail.  Ismail is immediately eligible and joins a number of additional walk-ons on the 2015 roster.

Coaching staff changes
Patterson formally announced coaching staff changes on February 25, 2015. Following the retirement of long-time TCU defensive coordinator Dick Bumpas, Patterson promoted safeties coach and former Texas Tech defensive coordinator Chad Glasgow and TCU linebackers coach DeMontie Cross to co-defensive coordinators. TCU director of player personnel Dan Sharp was reassigned as the defensive line coach, and three-year graduate assistant Paul Gonzales was named the Frogs' cornerbacks coach. Further coaching staff changes include the shuffling and addition of analysis and graduate assistants, including the addition of former TCU linebacker and 2009 5th-round draft pick Jason Phillips.

Spring practice
The Horned Frogs' formal spring practice ran from February 28 through April 10. In their April 9 spring game, the Frogs were without quarterback Trevone Boykin, who underwent minor surgery on his non-throwing wrist prior to the final week of spring practice. The focus of spring ball was squarely on the defense, where Coach Patterson must replace 5 starters, including 2 linebackers. Offensive coordinators Meacham and Cumbie, meanwhile, focused on improving the year-old up-tempo offense and identifying a backup quarterback.

Spring 2015 "way-too-early" pre-season rankings from most major sports news outlets, issued after the end of the 2014 season tabbed the 2015 Horned Frogs at #1 (ESPN-Martin Rickman), #2 (Sports Illustrated), #2 (CBSSports), and #2 (ESPN-Mark Schlabach).

Fall camp
In July, TCU was selected as the overwhelming favorite to win the Big 12 regular season crown, and Trevone Boykin emerged as the frontrunner in the 2015 Heisman Trophy race. During Big 12 media days, the media's attention fell heavily upon league frontrunners TCU and Baylor. Fall camp began on August 4, 2015.

Little news was released by Gary Patterson during the Horned Frogs' fall camp.  Rumors of injuries sustained by starting wide receivers Josh Doctson and Deante Gray, as well as starting defensive tackle Davion Pierson were unconfirmed, and Patterson revealed in late August that Doctson would likely play in the opener at Minnesota while Gray's readiness for the September 3 game remained questionable.  Late in fall camp, junior wide receiver and special teams punt returner Cameron Echols-Luper, son of TCU running backs coach Curtis Luper, announced his transfer to Arkansas State, where Echols-Luper hopes to play quarterback.

TCU was ranked #2 in both the preseason Amway (USA Today) Coaches Poll and the preseason AP Poll.

Schedule
TCU was one of only four teams in the country to play six road games against Power 5 Conference opponents. The Horned Frogs' road schedule included a non-conference season opener at Minnesota and five Big 12 road games.  The Frogs will had only one mid-season bye during week eight of the regular season. 

Schedule Source: GoFrogs.com and FBschedules.com

Rankings

Game summaries

Minnesota

TCU was one of only three consensus-top 25 teams to play a true road game against a Power 5 Conference opponent in week one, joining the #1 Ohio State Buckeyes at Virginia Tech and the #20 Stanford Cardinal at Northwestern.  Of the three, only #2 TCU and #1 Ohio State returned home with victories.

Stephen F. Austin

The 70 points scored by the Horned Frogs in this game marked the second-highest score of any TCU Horned Frogs football team in the program's 120-year history (the record of 82 points was set against the Texas Tech Red Raiders in 2014).  This win extended TCU's winning streak to 10 games and improved Gary Patterson's record to 21–1 when coaching a TCU team ranked in the top 5 and 32–3 when coaching a TCU team ranked in the top 10.

SMU

This 95th Battle for the Iron Skillet came 100 years after the Frogs and Mustangs first met in October 1915 at TCU's Clark Field, a meeting TCU won 43–0. The Horned Frogs celebrated Family Weekend and Clark Society Weekend during this September 19, 2015, home game, and the TCU Lettermen's Association inducted several new members into its Hall of Fame as part of the weekend's festivities.

Texas Tech

The Horned Frogs' thrilling 55–52 last-minute win over Texas Tech marked TCU's first win in Lubbock, Texas, since 1991.  TCU's 750 yards of offense was the third-most in school history (the record was set against Texas Tech in 2014, with 785).  Trevone Boykin's 485 passing yards was the second-most by a quarterback in school history.  Josh Doctson's 267 receiving yards set a new TCU single-game record, and his 18 receptions tied the TCU record.

Texas

The Horned Frogs celebrated Homecoming during the October 3, 2015, Big 12 home opener versus Texas. The 50–7 win was the Horned Frogs' first home win over the Longhorns since 1992, and TCU's wins over the Longhorns in 2014 and 2015 mark the Frogs' first back-to-back wins over Texas since the 1950s.  Trevone Boykin threw for 332 yards without playing in the fourth quarter.  The third of his five touchdown passes broke the career touchdown pass record set by former TCU and current Cincinnati Bengals quarterback Andy Dalton from 2007–2010.  Josh Doctson caught two touchdown passes, the latter of which broke former TCU wide receiver and former New England Patriot and Super Bowl Champion Josh Boyce's TCU career record.

Kansas State

As the winner of the 2015 TCU–Kansas State football game, TCU took the lead in the all-time series against the Wildcats, with an overall record of 5–4. The Horned Frogs' come-from-behind win marked Gary Patterson's first win as a head coach against his alma mater in Manhattan.  Jaden Oberkrom tied the all-time TCU career field goal record with a 50-yd field goal in the first half.  The win marked the Frogs' 14th in a row, tying the all-time TCU record for consecutive wins. TCU's 52 points notched a school-record 5-game-50+ point streak.  With the win, the Horned Frogs are now 25–1 when ranked in the top 5 and 36–3 when ranked in the top 10 under coach Patterson.

Iowa State

The Frogs remained perfect, extending the 2015 record to 7–0 and setting a new school record with a 15-game winning streak (dating back to 2014).  TCU's top Heisman Trophy candidate, quarterback Trevone Boykin, accounted for 510 yards and 5 touchdowns.  After a back-and-forth start, the Horned Frogs defense held the Cyclones scoreless through the second, third and fourth quarters.  The Frogs' win marked the nation's-best fourth road victory over a Power 5 Conference foe.  After the game, the Frogs entered their sole mid-season bye week sitting at first place in the Big 12 Conference standings.

West Virginia

TCU hosted WVU on a Thursday night in Fort Worth following the Frogs' only mid-season bye week. The Frogs' 30-point win marked the first time in four Big 12 meetings that the winner of the TCU–WVU game was not decided on the final play.  Jaden Oberkrom's 57-yard field goal at the end of the first half tied a TCU record. Trevone Boykin's 472 yards of offense brought his career total to 12,041 yards, enough to pass Andy Dalton's career record of 11,925 yards and become the most in TCU history. Josh Doctson broke the TCU record for receptions in a season with his 67th grab in only the Frogs' eighth game of 2015. He also joined Michael Crabtree as the only FBS wide receivers in the past 20 seasons with 6-straight games of 100 receiving yards and 2 touchdowns. After an impressive run by Trevone Boykin, Dana Holgorsen offered Trevone Boykin a high-five on the WVU sideline.

Oklahoma State

The Horned Frogs 16-game winning streak (dating back to October 2014) and undefeated season came to an end in Stillwater, Oklahoma.  Heisman Trophy hopeful Trevone Boykin committed five turnovers, including four interceptions, as the TCU offense struggled to keep pace with the Cowboys' offense, which struck deep for four touchdown passes of 48 yards or more.  Leading TCU receiver Josh Doctson exited the game early with a wrist injury that took away the Horned Frogs' most dangerous deep threat.

Kansas

TCU improved to 9–1 (6–1) on the season and remained perfect against the Jayhawks since joining the Big 12 Conference, but Heisman-contending quarterback Trevone Boykin left the game with an ankle injury in the first quarter and did not return. The win extended the Horned Frogs' home winning streak to 12 games.

Oklahoma

The top-20 matchup between two 9–1 teams came ten years after the shocking TCU win in Norman that propelled the rise of the Horned Frogs on the national stage.  TCU played without its starting quarterback and preseason Heisman Trophy favorite Trevone Boykin after he suffered an ankle injury early in the Frogs' game against Kansas on November 14.  Leading wide receiver Josh Doctson, who received Heisman Trophy consideration midseason, was also out due to a wrist injury suffered at Oklahoma State on November 7.  Including these two injuries, which topped pre-game headlines, the injury-plagued Horned Frogs squad was without its starting quarterback, 4 of their 6 top wide receivers, 2 of their 6 top offensive linemen, one starting defensive end, two starting linebackers, their starting free safety, one starting cornerback, and their starting long snapper.  Additional early-season losses had also depleted the Frogs' depth.  The Horned Frogs stormed back in the fourth quarter but failed to convert a would-be-winning-2-point try with less than a minute remaining.

Baylor

The Horned Frogs closed their regular season with a two-overtime victory of the Baylor Bears, evening the most-played series in both programs' history at 52–52–7.  Appropriately, the first meeting in the series' long history, in 1899, ended in a 0–0 tie, and by the time the Horned Frogs joined the Big 12 in 2012, the series was tied at 50–50–7.  The matchup between the two defending Big 12 co-champions was highly anticipated since Baylor stunned the Frogs with a 21-point, fourth-quarter comeback in 2014.

Oregon (Alamo Bowl)

The Horned Frogs' closed the 2015 season with a 47–41 3OT victory in the Alamo Bowl. After Trevone Boykin was suspended from the game following his involvement in a bar fight, the Horned Frogs turned to walk-on backup quarterback Bram Kohlhausen, a fifth year senior who made his first and only start at TCU quarterback. After falling behind 0–31 at halftime, the Frogs roared back to tie the game at the end of regulation and win the game in the third overtime period.  Kohlhausen was named the Alamo Bowl Offensive MVP and Travin Howard was named the Alamo Bowl defensive MVP.

Personnel

Roster

Returning starters
TCU anticipated the return of the below-listed starters (10 offensive starters, 5 defensive starters, and 2 players on special teams).  Preseason and early-season injuries plagued the Horned Frogs, rendering several of the returners unavailable for all or part of the 2015 season, including Deante' Gray (season), Kolby Listenbee (several weeks), Ty Slanina (early, season-ending injury), James McFarland (season), Terrell Lathan (several weeks), Davion Pierson (several weeks), and Ranthony Texada (early, season-ending injury).  Additionally, week 1 starting linebacker Mike Freeze left the team for personal reasons, and starting linebacker Sammy Dougals and starting safety Kenny Iloka suffered early season-ending injuries.

Offense

Defense

Special teams

Depth chart
As released October 12, 2015, prior to the Frogs' week 7 game at Iowa State:

Offense

Defense

Special teams

Awards and honors

Preseason awards

Weekly awards

Midseason awards

Award watch lists

Award semifinalists

Award finalists

Postseason awards

Bowl awards

References

TCU
TCU Horned Frogs football seasons
Alamo Bowl champion seasons
TCU Horned Frogs football